Taunton Deane is a local government district with borough status in the English county of Somerset. In the United Kingdom, the term listed building refers to a building or other structure officially designated as being of special architectural, historical or cultural significance; Grade I structures are those considered to be "buildings of exceptional interest". Listing was begun by a provision in the Town and Country Planning Act 1947. Once listed, severe restrictions are imposed on the modifications allowed to a building's structure or its fittings. In England, the authority for listing under the Planning (Listed Buildings and Conservation Areas) Act 1990 rests with Historic England, a non-departmental public body sponsored by the Department for Digital, Culture, Media and Sport; local authorities have a responsibility to regulate and enforce the planning regulations.

It is centred on the town of Taunton, where around 60,000 of the population live and the council are based, and includes surrounding suburbs and villages.

There are 38 Grade I listed buildings in Taunton Deane. The oldest buildings are churches built before the end of the 12th century, and the Castle Bow, which has been incorporated into the Castle Hotel in Taunton but was originally a gateway into Taunton Castle. The castle was created between 1107 and 1129, when William Giffard, the Chancellor of King Henry I, fortified the bishop's hall. It was his successor, Henry of Blois, who transformed the manor-house into a castle in 1138, during the Civil War that raged during the reign of his brother, King Stephen. Taunton is also the site of Gray's Almshouses, which dates from 1635, and a building in Fore Street from the 16th century. Most of the Grade I listed buildings in Taunton Deane are Norman or medieval era churches, many of which are included in the Somerset towers, a collection of distinctive, mostly spireless Gothic church towers. Many of the more recent structures in the list are manor houses such as Cothay Manor and Greenham Barton which were built in Stawley in the 15th century and 13th century respectively. Poundisford Park and Cothelstone Manor were both built in the 16th century and Hatch Court in 1755. The most recent building included in the list is Hestercombe House, which was rebuilt in 1909.

Buildings

|}

See also
 Grade I listed buildings in Somerset
 List of Somerset towers
 Grade II* listed buildings in Taunton Deane

Notes

References

External links

 
Lists of Grade I listed buildings in Somerset